Onda Communication S.p.A.  was an Italian cellular phone manufacturer.

Overview
The company's headquarters was in Roveredo in Piano (PN) with subsidiaries in Rome (Italy) and in Nanjing (China).

Telecom Italia was a major distributor of Onda handsets.

ONDA Brand is now adopted by ONDA TLC, a new company distributing senior phones and rugged phones.

Products

Mobile Phones
 N1000iB
 N1010
 N1020
 N1030
 N2020
 N2030
 N3000
 N3020
 N3030
 N4000
 N4000i
 N5000
 N5020

WIFI
 DUAL MODE Card N500DH
 EDGE Card N100E
 EDGE Card N775
 UMTS Card N300U

External links

New Onda Website
Satellite Mobile Phones
Phone Cases & Accessories

Telecommunications companies of Italy
Defunct mobile phone manufacturers
Mobile phone manufacturers

war:Ondra2868